In mathematics Alexander's theorem states that every knot or link can be represented as a closed braid; that is, a braid in which the corresponding ends of the strings are connected in pairs. The theorem is named after James Waddell Alexander II, who published a proof in 1923.

Braids were first considered as a tool of knot theory by Alexander. His theorem gives a positive answer to the question Is it always possible to transform a given knot into a closed braid? A good construction example is found in Colin Adams's book.

However, the correspondence between knots and braids is clearly not one-to-one: a knot may have many braid representations. For example, conjugate braids yield equivalent knots. This leads to a second fundamental question: Which closed braids represent the same knot type?
This question is addressed in Markov's theorem, which gives ‘moves’ relating any two closed braids that represent the same knot.

References 

Knot theory
Theorems in algebraic topology